was a Japanese author from Yokohama, Japan who authored over 20 books. He was also known for amassing a collection of over 900 ukiyo-e prints and establishing Japan's first mountaineering society.

References 

Japanese writers
Japanese art collectors
1873 births
1948 deaths